The men's pentathlon event at the 1959 Summer Universiade was held at the Stadio Comunale di Torino in Turin on 3 September 1959. It was the only time men contested the pentathlon at the Universiade with it being replaced with the decathlon from the next edition.

Results

References

Athletics at the 1959 Summer Universiade
1959